Thomas Michael Yurkovich (born September 29, 1935) is a former American ice hockey goaltender and Olympian.

Yurkovich played with Team USA at the 1964 Winter Olympics held in Innsbruck, Austria. He played for the University of North Dakota and for the Rochester Mustangs of the United States Hockey League.

Awards and honours

References

External links

1935 births
Living people
Ice hockey players at the 1964 Winter Olympics
Olympic ice hockey players of the United States
American men's ice hockey goaltenders